

The Baumgärtl PB-60 was a 1940s experimental single-seat rotor kite designed and built by Austrian designer Paul Baumgartl for the Brazilian Air Ministry. The PB-60 was unpowered and had to be towed to become airborne and fly. It had a fixed tricycle landing gear with a simple unpowered two-blade rotor.

Specifications

See also

References

Notes

Bibliography

Abandoned military aircraft projects of Brazil
Aircraft first flown in 1948
1940s Brazilian helicopters
1940s Brazilian experimental aircraft
Rotor kites
PB-60